Cecil Bishop may refer to:

C. W. Bishop
Cecil-Bishop, Pennsylvania

See also
Cecil Bishopp (disambiguation)